Lartington railway station was situated on the South Durham & Lancashire Union Railway between Barnard Castle and Kirkby Stephen East. It served the village of Lartington. The station opened to passenger traffic on 26 March 1861, and closed on 22 January 1962. The station and related buildings remain intact as a private dwelling.

In 1910, Lartington station was the site of an accident in which 7 people were injured.

References

 
 
 

South Durham and Lancashire Union Railway
Disused railway stations in County Durham
Former North Eastern Railway (UK) stations
Railway stations in Great Britain opened in 1861
Railway stations in Great Britain closed in 1962
1861 establishments in England